Red Mountain is the lower of three mountains that make up the Red Mountain Ski Area. It is nestled within the Monashee Mountains.

See also
 Red Mountain Ski Resort

External links
 Kootenay Skier's blog based in Rossland

References
 
 

Red Mountain
West Kootenay
Monashee Mountains
Kootenay Land District